Hypocalymma tenuatum is a member of the family Myrtaceae endemic to Western Australia.

It blooms between July and August producing cream-yellow flowers.

It is found among rocky outcrops and on ridges in a small area in the Wheatbelt region of Western Australia between Coorow and Dandaragan where it grows in sandy-loamy soils over sandstone.

References

tenuatum
Endemic flora of Western Australia
Rosids of Western Australia
Endangered flora of Australia
Plants described in 2002
Taxa named by Gregory John Keighery
Taxa named by Arne Strid